Banwari Lal Bairwa (19 January 1933 – 22 July 2009) was an Indian politician and former Deputy Chief Minister of Rajasthan. He is a former Member of Parliament from Tonk (Lok Sabha constituency) in Rajasthan. He was a leader of Indian National Congress.

References

1933 births
2009 deaths
Deputy chief ministers of Rajasthan
India MPs 1980–1984
India MPs 1984–1989
Lok Sabha members from Rajasthan
People from Tonk district
Members of the Rajasthan Legislative Assembly
Indian National Congress politicians from Rajasthan